Jan Kolář (born March 21, 1981) is a Czech professional ice hockey winger who currently plays for HC Donbass in the Kontinental Hockey League.

Career statistics

References

External links

1981 births
Czech ice hockey right wingers
EK Zell am See players
HC Berounští Medvědi players
HC Donbass players
HC Dukla Jihlava players
HC Dynamo Pardubice players
HC Neftekhimik Nizhnekamsk players
HC Slavia Praha players
Hokej Šumperk 2003 players
Living people
People from Boskovice
Sportspeople from the South Moravian Region
Stadion Hradec Králové players
Czech expatriate ice hockey players in Russia
Czech expatriate sportspeople in Austria
Expatriate ice hockey players in Austria